Classical Chinese grammar is the grammar of Classical Chinese, a term that first and foremost refers to the written language of the classical period of Chinese literature, from the end of the Spring and Autumn period (early 5th century BC) to the foundation of the Qin Dynasty (221 BC), or in a broader sense, to the end of the Han Dynasty (AD 220). The term "Classical Chinese" is also often used for the higher language register used in writing during most of the following centuries (a register generally referred to by sinologists as "Literary Chinese"); however, this article focuses on the grammar used in the classical period.

The present article uses modern Mandarin character readings following common practice among scholars, even though it is also possible to read Classical Chinese using the literary readings of other modern Chinese varieties (as commonly done in Hong Kong, where Cantonese readings are generally used), or even using a reconstruction of character readings belonging to centuries past.

Compared to the written vernacular Chinese of today, the most notable difference is that Classical Chinese rarely uses words composed of two Chinese characters; nearly all words are written with one character only. This stands directly in contrast with vernacular Chinese, in which two-character words are extremely common. This phenomenon exists, in part, because as sound changes created homophones among words, compounding was used to resolve ambiguities.

Typological overview
Classical Chinese has long been noted for the absence of inflectional morphology: nouns and adjectives do not inflect for case, definiteness, gender, specificity or number; neither do verbs inflect for person, number, tense, aspect, telicity, valency, evidentiality or voice. However, in terms of derivational morphology, it makes use of compounding, reduplication and perhaps affixation, although not in a productive way. There is also an extensive use of zero-derivation.

The basic constituent order of Classical Chinese is subject-verb-object (SVO), but is not fully consistent: there are particular situations where the VS and OV word orders appear. Topic-and-comment constructions are often used. Neither a topic, nor the subject nor objects are mandatory, being often dropped when their meaning is understood (pragmatically inferable), and copular sentences often do not have a verb.

Within a noun phrase, demonstratives, quantifying determiners, adjectives, possessors and relative clauses precede the head noun, while cardinal numbers can appear before or after the noun they modify. Within a verb phrase, adverbs usually appear before a verb. The language, as analyzed in this article, uses coverbs (in a serial verb construction) and postpositions. Classical Chinese makes heavy use of parataxis where English would use a dependent clause; however, there are means to form dependent clauses, some of which appear before the main clause while others appear after. There are also a number of sentence-final particles.

Two simple coordinated nouns can be joined with a conjunction, but this is not always the case. This, combined with the fact that two nouns in a possessor-possessed construction are not always marked for their functions either, can lead to ambiguity:   (literally: "mountain forest") could mean either "mountains and forests" or "the forest of a mountain".

With the absence of inflectional morphology, Classical Chinese is largely a zero-marking language, except that possessors and relative clauses are usually dependent-marked with a grammatical particle.

Negation is achieved by placing a negative particle before the verb. Yes-no questions are marked with a sentence-final particle, while wh-questions are marked with in-situ interrogative pronouns. There are a number of passive constructions, but passives are sometimes not marked differently from active constructions, at least when written.

The lexicon of Classical Chinese has been traditionally divided into two large categories: content words (literally: "substantial words") and function words (literally: "empty words"). Scholars of Classical Chinese grammar notably disagree on how to further divide these two categories exactly, but a classification using word classes similar to those of Latin (noun, adjective, verb, pronoun, etc.) has been common. However, this remains debated, as many words can be used as multiple parts of speech. Examples shown below.

Word class flexibility
 adjective used as noun:  ; lit: "wise increase wise", actually means: "a wise person becomes wiser"
 adjective used as verb:  ; lit: "a good place not constant", actually means: "a good place will not last forever"
 adjective used as adverb:  ; lit: "vain cost", i.e. "vainly cost (subject) ... "
 noun used as verb:  ; lit: "along the river East", actually means: "rowing down the river to the East"
 noun used as adverbial:  ; lit: "(a wolf) dog sit in the front", actually means: "(a wolf) is sitting in the front like a dog"
 verb used as noun (rare case):  ; lit: "ride gallop or wind", actually means: "ride a galloping horse or wind" 
 verb used as adverb (rare case):  ; lit: "compete cede territory", actually means: "cede territory spontaneously and actively"

Verbs
While an English sentence can be divided into active voice or passive voice depending on the form of the verb within the sentence, the verbs in classical Chinese have several usages based on the relationship between the verb and the object. Moreover, a verb does not change its form at different situations, with the exception of the beidong usage of verbs. Within the examples shown below, the words located within parentheses do not appear in the original Chinese sentence.

 Yidong usage

In classical Chinese, it is common for nouns or adjectives to be used as verbs or adjectives, and most of these cases involve a yidong usage of verbs.
One peculiarity is that a word that is originally a verb does not share the same usage. In addition, there are slight differences in meaning between the noun and the adjective in the usage. 

For a noun, it becomes an action done by the subject which indicates the subjects opinion about the object in the form "consider (object) as + (the noun)".

For an adjective, it becomes an observation in the form of "consider (object) (the adjective)".

 Shidong usage

In this case, nouns, verbs and adjectives share usage, but with different meanings.

For a noun, it means "make ... + (the noun)". For instance:

Literal translation: (Fulfilling the agreement that) the person who defeated the Qin Dynasty and entered Xianyang first, [people] would king him.(Note: Such scenarios are rare, though historical cases exist in ancient China. The translation of the sentence is rather controversial; the interpretation provided above represents the most widespread consensus.)

For a verb, it could mean "make... + do/done/to do", depending on the sentence. For instance:
 
Literal translation: (The music was so sad that) cry the widow in a lonely boatSemantic translation: (The music was so sad that it) made the widow in a lonely boat cry.

For an adjective, it means "make... + (the adjective)". For instance:
 
Literal translation: Since you have been here, then calm yourself hereSemantic translation: Since you have been here, make yourself calm here.

 Weidong usage

The following examples demonstrate weidong usage of verbs. Such usage may occur:
 to express a motion that is based on a purpose. For instance:
 
 Literal translation: It's equally death (delay for work and protest the rule of the Qin Dynasty), is die country an option?Semantic translation: It's death in any case, is dying for the country an option?
 to express an action due to a particular reason. For instance:
 
 Literal translation: He suffer(v.) coughSemantic translation: He suffered from a cough.
 to help the object do something. For instance:
 
 Literal translation: Himself introduction his own poemSemantic translation: He wrote the introduction to his own poem .
 to execute a motion to the object. For instance:
 
 Literal translation: Cry it for three daysSemantic translation: Mourn over it for three days.

Pronouns
Pronouns can be separated into the following groups:
 Personal, e.g.   'you'
 Reciprocal:   'each other'
 Reflexive:  ,   'oneself, themselves'
 Interrogative, e.g.   'who'
 Indefinite:   'another, others',   'someone, so-and-so',   'someone',   'everyone',   'all'

Classical Chinese did not distinguish number in some of its pronouns, for example,   could mean either 'I, me' or 'we, us'. There was no 3rd-person personal pronoun form that could be used in subject position, but the distal demonstrative   'that, those' and the anaphoric demonstrative   frequently take that role.

The use of some nouns as pronoun-like terms is also attested. Common examples in texts are the humble   'servant' in the 1st person, and   'son; master' in the 2nd person.

Classical Chinese interrogative pronouns and adverbs are notably polysemic, many of them bearing multiple meanings.

An example where this polysemy is exploited is found in a tale in the Zhuangzi (chapter 17). Zhuangzi is asked "how do you know this?" (with the interrogative  ), but being unable to answer the question, intentionally misinterprets it as "where did you (get to) know this?".

Core constituent order
The usual order of core constituents in Classical Chinese is subject, verb, and direct object (SVO).

Important exceptions to this basic order exist. When a verb is negated, a personal pronoun serving as the direct object is placed between the negative particle and the verb, leading to OV order.

Interrogative pronouns similarly generally precede the verb when they're the direct object.

In the latter example, the predicate's verbal phrase is   "to be/lie where", while the following words (until  ) are the subject.

When the topic-and-comment construction is used, the topic phrase (which expresses what a sentence "is about": "Regarding this person...", "As for this thing...") goes at the front (start) of the sentence, often but not always marked with a topic particle, alternatively repeated by a resumptive pronoun.

Copular sentences

Classical Chinese typically does not use a copula verb to express positive nominal predication ("X is a/the Y"). Instead, it places two noun phrases (one of which could be a pronoun) followed by a final particle, usually  . The particle can be omitted but rarely is.

However, Classical Chinese did not lack copula verbs, as it not only had the negative copula   (used to express "X is not Y"), but also the positive  . The final particle is commonly optional when these verbs are used.

See also
 Chinese adjectives
 Chinese grammar
 Chinese honorifics
 Chinese particles
 Chinese pronouns
 Chinese verbs
 Classical Chinese
 Classical Chinese lexicon
 Vernacular Chinese

References

Sources

Further reading
 (Original from Harvard University) (Digitized 2008-10-13)
 
  (Original from Oxford University) (Digitized 2007-07-03)
  (Original from the University of California) (Digitized 2007-05-02)
  (Original from Harvard University)
 
 
 

Chinese grammar
Classical Chinese
Sino-Tibetan grammars